Maura Visser (born 1 June 1985) is a Dutch handballer who plays as a playmaker for SG BBM Bietigheim.

She competed at the 2010 European Women's Handball Championship, where the Dutch team placed eighth, and Visser was listed among the top ten goalscorers of the tournament (scoring 36 goals). She was taken off the national team after the 2011 World Championships but was selected by new head coach Helle Thomsen to make her return at the 2016 European Championships where the Dutch national team won silver.

References

1985 births
Living people
Sportspeople from The Hague
Dutch female handball players
Expatriate handball players
Dutch expatriate sportspeople in Denmark
Dutch expatriate sportspeople in Germany
Viborg HK players
21st-century Dutch women